Compositor may refer to:

 Compositor (typesetting), a person or machine which arranged movable type for printing
 Paige Compositor, a device developed to replace manual compositors, which was a commercial failure
 Compositing software, used in film post-production for compositing, special effects, and color correction
 Compositing window manager, a software process which composites off-screen buffers for each open window to create a screen image
 Quartz Compositor, the display server and window manager in macOS
 Wayland compositor, any computer display server compatible with the Wayland protocol

See also 
 Compositing, combining visual elements from separate sources into a single result. Originally used for a tradesman in the printing industry a compositor, who assembled movable type and blocks to form a page for printing.
Subsequently used in the film industry.